Ye Ji-won (born February 1, 1973) is a South Korean actress.

Career
She is best known for her leading role in the hit sitcom Old Miss Diary, and her more serious turns in Hong Sang-soo films Turning Gate and Hahaha.

In October 2018, Ye signed with new agency The Queen AMC.

Filmography

Film

Television series

Web series

Television show

Hosting

Theater

Ambassadorship 
 Seoul Dance Film Festival (SeDaFF) Ambassador (2021–2025)

Awards and nominations

References

External links
 Ye Ji-won Fan Cafe at Daum
 
 
 

1973 births
Living people
People from Seoul
Actresses from Seoul
South Korean female taekwondo practitioners
South Korean film actresses
South Korean television actresses
South Korean stage actresses
South Korean musical theatre actresses
Seoul Institute of the Arts alumni
Best Supporting Actress Paeksang Arts Award (television) winners